Ping Wu (born May 16, 1956) is an American television and film actor.

Personal life
Wu is Chinese–American. His father was author and educator Nelson Ikon Wu, and his sister, Ting Wu, is a genetics professor at the Harvard Medical School.

Career
Wu is best known for the recurring role of "Ping," the delivery boy, on the television sitcom, Seinfeld. He has also appeared on other sitcoms, such as How I Met Your Mother, Two and a Half Men, The King of Queens, Anger Management, and Rules of Engagement. He appeared in the 1988 TV mini-series, Noble House, Rock Hudson and The Adventures of Young Indiana Jones: Journey of Radiance. He played a Japanese officer in the 2001 film Pearl Harbor, as well as a physician in the 1991 medical drama The Doctor.

He appeared in three episodes of the fourth season of 24. 

He also appeared in an episode of Californication; and has been featured in several television commercials.

He appeared in Fresh Off The Boat and has a recurring role as Henry on Silicon Valley.

Wu has also worked as a voice actor in the video game Fallout 4.

Filmography

References

External links
 

1956 births
20th-century American male actors
21st-century American male actors
American male actors of Chinese descent
American male film actors
American male television actors
Living people
McKelvey School of Engineering alumni
Washington University in St. Louis alumni